Sprouts Farmers Market, Inc., is a supermarket chain headquartered in Phoenix, Arizona, USA. The grocer offers a wide selection of natural and organic foods, including fresh produce, bulk foods, vitamins and supplements, packaged groceries, meat, poultry, seafood, deli, baked goods, dairy products, frozen foods, natural body care, and household items. Sprouts employs 35,000 workers and operates more than 380 stores in 23 states.

History
In 1943, Henry Boney opened a fresh-fruit stand in San Diego, California, which grew into a handful of open-air farmers markets. In 1969, his sons developed Boney's Market, which grew into a beloved community grocery store. By 1997, the family's unique set of small-box farmers-market grocery stores were renamed Henry's Farmers Market after their father. Sprouts Farmers Market was founded in 2002 in Chandler, Arizona, by members of the Boney family. In 2011, Henry's, Sun Harvest, and Sprouts came together again under Apollo Global Management and all were rebranded as Sprouts stores. In 2012, Sunflower was acquired and was also rebranded Sprouts. Sprouts became a public company traded on NASDAQ in 2013.

Fortune included Sprouts on its list of the World's Most Admired Companies in 2018 and 2019.

In 2021, Sprouts Farmers Market partnered with MyFitnessPal to provide food-related content support to the app, which included library of healthy recipes, health and fitness challenges, and food- and health-related articles.

Charitable giving
In 2015, Sprouts founded the Healthy Communities Foundation, which supports local health and wellness-related causes. Since then, the foundation has awarded more than $18 million to nonprofit partners across 23 states. In 2021, the foundation gave away more than $3million in grants to over 115 organizations.

Sustainability
Sprouts operates with a focus on the environment, product quality, supply chain transparency, team members, and local communities. As part of Sprouts' commitment to "zero waste", Sprouts participates in a food waste diversion program that provides food to those in need, feed for animals, and nutrients for agricultural soil. All edible food that is no longer fit for sale is donated to hunger-relief agencies, and food that is not fit for them is donated as cattle feed. Everything else is donated as compost. In 2019, the U.S. Environmental Protection Agency  recognized Sprouts with several recognitions through its GreenChill program, a partnership with food retailers to reduce refrigerant emissions and decrease their impact on the ozone layer and climate change.

The store's use of the term "farmers market" has been criticized by local farmers and food sovereignty advocates for appropriating a term they believe should be reserved for direct-to-consumer sales venues.

Products
Sprouts offers a wide selection of products that are minimally processed and free of artificial flavors, colors, preservatives, and synthetic ingredients. The company says that 90% of its products meet this standard.

Sprouts has its own private-label brand of products, featuring more than 2,400 items. Stores offers beef products that range from choice cuts to grass-fed. Sprouts has a large vitamins and supplements department with more than 7,500 products. Produce makes up about a quarter of the business for Sprouts, and the stores carry around 200 varieties of organic produce. As a healthy-food grocer dedicated to affordability and accessibility, one-third of the store stock is always on promotion.

Animal-product concerns
In April 2017, the network Direct Action Everywhere  released the results of their investigation into cage-free egg supplier Morning Fresh Farms. The Phoenix Business Journal covered the investigation and included comments from Sprouts, noting that Morning Fresh Farms provided inspection reports and certification documents showing compliance that indicated the video shared in the results was not reflective of the farm's cage-free facility in Colorado.

Store locations
Sprouts has locations in Alabama, Arizona, California, Colorado, Delaware,  Florida, Georgia, Kansas, Louisiana, Maryland, Missouri, Nevada, New Jersey, New Mexico, North Carolina, Oklahoma, Pennsylvania, South Carolina, Tennessee, Texas, Utah, Virginia, and Washington.

References

External links
 

Health food stores
Supermarkets of the United States
Companies based in Phoenix, Arizona
Organic food retail organizations
Companies listed on the Nasdaq
American companies established in 2002
Retail companies established in 2002
2002 establishments in Arizona
2013 initial public offerings